T. Geron "Jerry" Bell (born 1937) is a former executive in Major League Baseball who served as president of the Minnesota Twins from 1987 to 2002, and president of its holding company, Twins Sports Inc., from 2002 until his retirement in 2011.

He grew up in North St. Paul, Minnesota, graduating from North High School in 1959. A baseball field was named in his honor in 2017 in his hometown.

Bell was inducted into the Twins Hall of Fame on August 4, 2019.

References

External links
MLB.com: 2005 Interview on new Twins ballpark
 Target Field: ‘The House That Jerry Bell Willed to Completion’ MinnPost, Jay Weiner, 4/1/2010

Living people
Major League Baseball executives
Minnesota Twins executives
People from North St. Paul, Minnesota
1937 births